The 2021 Súper TC2000 Championship is the 43rd season of Turismo Competición 2000 and the 10th season of Súper TC2000, the premier touring car category of Argentina. The series began on the 13th of March 2021 at the Autódromo Oscar y Juan Gálvez and will finish on the 28th of November 2021 after 12 events.

Matías Rossi is the reigning champion.

Teams and drivers

Race calendar and results

Overview

Championship standings
Points system

Drivers' championship

 – Driver who competed for championship points outside the Buenos Aires 200km but was the designated co-driver for the aforementioned event and was therefore ineligible for points in it.

Notes

References

External links
 

Súper TC2000
Súper TC2000
TC 2000 Championship seasons